Paoni 12 - Coptic Calendar - Paoni 14

The thirteenth day of the Coptic month of Paoni, the tenth month of the Coptic year. In common years, this day corresponds to June 7, of the Julian Calendar, and June 20, of the Gregorian Calendar.

Commemorations

Intercessors 

 The commemoration of the Archangel Gabriel, the Announcer

Saints 

 The departure of Saint John, Bishop of Jerusalem

References 

Days of the Coptic calendar